John H. Benson (born July 30, 1943) is a Minnesota politician and former member of the Minnesota House of Representatives. A member of the Minnesota Democratic–Farmer–Labor Party (DFL), he represented District 44B, which includes portions of western Hennepin County in the Twin Cities metropolitan area.

Minnesota House of Representatives
Benson was first elected in 2006 and re-elected in 2008, 2010, and 2012. He announced on December 18, 2013, that he will not run for re-election in 2014.

References

External links

Rep. John Benson official Minnesota House of Representatives website
Minnesota Public Radio - Votetracker: John Benson's voting record
Project Vote Smart - Profile of Rep. John H. Benson (MN)
Follow the Money - John Benson campaign contributions 2006 2004

1943 births
Living people
People from Glasgow, Montana
People from Minnetonka, Minnesota
Democratic Party members of the Minnesota House of Representatives
American Lutherans
University of Minnesota alumni
21st-century American politicians